The Day After Tomorrow is the second studio album by American hip hop recording artist Maino. The album was released on February 28, 2012 via Atlantic Records and E1 Music. The album features guest appearances from T.I., Meek Mill, Roscoe Dash and Lloyd Banks, among others.

Background
The album was originally scheduled to be released on October 4, 2011 but it got pushed back to February 28, 2012. In preparation for the album's release, Maino released a promotional mixtape titled I Am Who I Am, on January 26, 2012. The mixtape included the remix to "Let It Fly" and "Cream" featuring T.I. and Meek Mill.

Singles
"Let It Fly" was released as the album's lead single on June 14, 2011. The song features Roscoe Dash, and the music video, directed by Michael Dispenza, premiered on August 1, 2011. The second single from the album, "That Could Be Us" featuring Robbie Nova, was released on October 18, 2011. The album's third single was "The Day After Tomorrow" and was released to U.S. urban radio on March 6, 2012.

Commercial performance
The album debuted at number 94 on the Billboard 200 with first-week sales of 6,300 copies in the United States. In its second week, the album sold another 2,200 copies total at 8,500.

Track listing

Charts

References

2012 albums
Maino albums
Atlantic Records albums
E1 Music albums
Albums produced by Buckwild